Rudolph Karl Alexander Schneider, commonly known as Sascha Schneider (21 September 1870 – 18 August 1927), was a German painter and sculptor.

Biography
Schneider was born in Saint Petersburg in 1870. During his childhood, his family lived in Zürich, but following the death of his father, Schneider moved to Dresden, where he became a student at the Dresden Academy of Fine Arts in 1889. In 1903, he met best-selling author Karl May, and subsequently became the cover illustrator of a number of May's books including Winnetou, Old Surehand, Am Rio de la Plata. A year later in 1904, Schneider was appointed professor at the Großherzoglich-Sächsische Kunstschule Weimar.

During this period, Schneider lived with painter . Jahn began blackmailing Schneider by threatening to expose his homosexuality, which was punishable under § 175 of the penal code. Schneider fled to Italy, where homosexuality was not criminalized at that time. In Italy, Schneider met painter , with whom he traveled through the Caucasus Mountains. He then traveled back to Germany, where he lived for six months in Leipzig before returning to Italy, where he resided in Florence. When the First World War started, Schneider returned to Germany again, taking up residence in Hellerau (near Dresden). After 1918, he co-founded an institute called Kraft-Kunst for bodybuilding. Some of the models for his art trained here.

Schneider, who suffered from diabetes mellitus, suffered a diabetic seizure during a ship voyage in the vicinity of Swinemünde. As a result, he collapsed and died in 1927 in Swinemünde. He was buried in Loschwitz Cemetery, Germany.

In popular culture
Schneider's painting Hypnosis (in Gallery below) inspired a key shot in the Robert Eggers film The Lighthouse.

Works
 Mein Gestalten und Bilden. 1912. autobiography

Exhibitions
Sascha Schneider - Ideenmaler & Körperbildner/"Sascha Schneider - Visualizing ideas through the human body" (2013), Stadtmuseum Weimar
"Nude in Public: Sascha Schneider - Homoeroticism and the Male Form circa 1900" (2013), Leslie-Lohman Museum of Gay and Lesbian Art

Gallery

Literature
 Hans-Gerd Röder: Sascha Schneider - ein Maler für Karl May. Karl-May-Verlag. Bamberg 1995.  3-7802-0280-8.
 Rolf Günther / Dr. Klaus Hoffmann: Sascha Schneider & Karl May — Eine Künstlerfreundschaft. Karl-May-Stiftung. Radebeul 1989.
 Hansotto Hatzig: Karl May und Sascha Schneider. Dokumente einer Freundschaft. "Beiträge zur Karl-May-Forschung". Edition 2. Bamberg 1967.
 Annelotte Range: Zwischen Max Klinger und Karl May. Karl-May-Verlag. Bamberg 1999. 3-7802-3007-0.
 Felix Zimmermann: Sascha Schneider. Verlag der Schönheit. Dresden 1924.
 Sascha Schneider: Titelzeichnungen zu den Werken Karl Mays. Verlag von Friedrich Ernst Fehsenfeld. Freiburg. 1905.

References

External links
 
 Sascha Schneider in German National Library
 Sascha Schneider's grave

1870 births
1927 deaths
19th-century German painters
19th-century German male artists
Art Nouveau painters
German male painters
German Symbolist painters
20th-century German painters
20th-century German male artists
Russian male painters
Artists from Dresden
Artists from Zürich
German gay artists
Russian gay artists
German LGBT painters
Russian LGBT painters
Gay painters